Betsy Sodaro  is an American actress. She is a regular performer at the Upright Citizens Brigade Theater in Los Angeles. Sodaro is best known for her appearances on comedy programs such as Another Period, Duncanville, Clipped, Animal Practice, Nailed It and Big Time in Hollywood, FL.

Life and career
Sodaro is originally from Summit County, Colorado, and graduated from Western State Colorado University in 2006, with a degree in communications and theater. After graduating, she trained and performed at the Sacramento Comedy Spot and moved to Los Angeles in 2007. She performs regularly at the Upright Citizens Brigade Theatre with house improv teams Bangarang! and Search History and house sketch team Nephew. Sodaro cites Chris Farley among her comedic influences.

Sodaro has been in films such as Monsters University and The To Do List, and has made guest appearances on television shows such as Raising Hope, Comedy Bang Bang, NTSF:SD:SUV::, Stevie TV, and Kroll Show. In 2010, she was a cast member in UCB co-founder Matt Besser's Comedy Central sketch pilot This Show Will Get You High, along with Besser, Brett Gelman, John Gemberling, and Paul Rust. In 2012, Sodaro co-starred in the short-lived NBC sitcom Animal Practice. She also plays recurring roles on the Comedy Central's Another Period and Big Time in Hollywood, FL and co-starred on the TBS sitcom Clipped.

Sodaro is a frequent guest on Matt Besser's podcast improv4humans, having appeared on the show over 12 times. She has also guested on many other podcasts on the Earwolf network such as on Comedy Bang! Bang!, Hollywood Handbook, With Special Guest Lauren Lapkus, The Andy Daly Podcast Pilot Project, The Hooray Show with Horatio, and more.

Betsy Sodaro also provided the voice of Plant from Warner Bros. Animation's Right Now Kapow, Xixi The Toucan from All Hail King Julien, and many more. She also played the character "Dabby" on the Netflix sitcom Disjointed starring Kathy Bates. In 2022 she appeared on Ghosts as Nancy, a ghost who died from cholera. And in High on Life, Sodaro voiced Sweezy, a talking alien gun known as a Gatlian.

Filmography

References

External links

 
 Betsy Sodaro on Funny or Die

Living people
Actresses from Colorado
American film actresses
American sketch comedians
American television actresses
American voice actresses
American women comedians
Comedians from Colorado
Upright Citizens Brigade Theater performers
21st-century American comedians
21st-century American actresses
Year of birth missing (living people)
Western Colorado University alumni